Andrea Crespo may refer to:

 Andrea Crespo (artist) (born 1993), New York-based artist
 Andrea Crespo (writer) (born 1983), Ecuadorian writer